The North Central Florida Chapter of NIGP (NCFC-NIGP) is a local chapter of the National Institute of Governmental Purchasing, a membership-based non-profit organization providing support to professionals in the public sector purchasing profession. NIGP provides its members with many services, including education, professional networking, research, and technical assistance. The NCFC chapter was formed in 2005 and serves the Gainesville and Ocala areas of North Central Florida, as well as Citrus County. The organization currently has over 55 active members, representing over 16 government agencies.

Each year the organization holds a Reverse Trade Show. The show provides many venders an opportunity to meet with various purchasing professionals from North Central Florida governmental agencies who procure goods and services that include operating supplies, equipment, construction, and all required services. Vendors have an opportunity to meet these professionals at manned booths and learn about future projects their companies may be interested in. These vendors will also be told how to conduct business with these entities and receive a yearly registry containing contact information for all participating organizations. 

The 2012 Reverse Trade Show is currently scheduled for June 20, 2012 at the College of Central Florida's Ocala Campus.

Agencies represented include
Alachua County Board of County Commissioners
Alachua County Health Department
Alachua County School Board 
College of Central Florida 
Citrus County Board of County Commissioners
City of Alachua
City of Gainesville
City of Ocala
Gainesville Regional Utilities
Marion County Board of County Commissioners 
Suwannee River Water Management District
University of Florida
University of Florida - SBVDR
University of Florida Athletic Association

See also
List of NIGP Chapters

External links
Facebook page

Organizations based in Florida